Robert Gilbert (fl. 1415–1432) was an English politician.

He was a Member (MP) of the Parliament of England for Gloucester from 1415 to 1432.

References

Year of birth missing
Year of death missing
15th-century English people
People from Gloucester
Members of the Parliament of England (pre-1707) for Gloucester